Anthony Vincent Genovese (born 1932) was an American architect who practiced in the mid to late-twentieth-century New York and New Jersey as a partner in the architectural firm name Genovese & Maddalene.

Personal life
Anthony Vincent Genovese was born on February 25, 1932, in Union City, New Jersey, he earned his Bachelor of Architecture from the University of Notre Dame in 1955 and earned his Master of Fine Arts in architecture from Princeton University in 1957.

Career
In 1955, he was awarded the Church Property Administration Sculpture Award, the Sollitt Prize for Design & Construction Award, the  Student AIA Medal, and the Fire Underwriters scholarship. He was a Buehler Fellow from 1955 to 1956. Genovese joined the New Jersey Society of Architects, American Institute of Architects, in 1964, and was registered to practice in New York and New Jersey.

With Herbert F. Maddalene, Anthony V. Genovese established the firm Genovese & Maddalene in 1963. The firm focused primarily on the design of churches in a Modernist style, and related work.

In 1982, Genovese was convicted along with state senator William Musto, organized crime figure Rudolph Orlandini, and others for participation in a bribery and kickbacks scheme related to school construction projects in Union, NJ and received a suspended sentence.

Works with Genovese & Maddalene
1967: Church of the Holy Name of Jesus (Rochester, New York)
1968: Advent Lutheran Church (Wyckoff, New Jersey)
1969: Our Lady of Good Counsel Church (Staten Island, New York)
1969: Our Lady of Mt. Carmel Church (Staten Island, New York)
1969: Church of the Nativity (Manhattan)

References

1932 births
20th-century American architects
American people of Italian descent
Defunct architecture firms based in New Jersey
Architecture firms based in New Jersey
Architects from New Jersey
People from Union City, New Jersey
Notre Dame School of Architecture alumni
Princeton University School of Architecture alumni
American ecclesiastical architects
Architects of Roman Catholic churches
Architects of Lutheran churches
Modernist architects
Living people
Fellows of the American Institute of Architects